Bala Aerodrome  is located adjacent to Bala, Ontario, Canada.

See also
List of airports in the Bala, Ontario area

References

Registered aerodromes in Ontario

Transport in Bala, Ontario